The 2003 Trophée Lalique was the fourth event of six in the 2003–04 ISU Grand Prix of Figure Skating, a senior-level international invitational competition series. It was held at the Palais Omnisports Paris Bercy in Paris on November 13–16. Medals were awarded in the disciplines of men's singles, ladies' singles, pair skating, and ice dancing. Skaters earned points toward qualifying for the 2003–04 Grand Prix Final. The compulsory dance was the Austrian Waltz.

The competition was named after the Lalique company, which was its chief sponsor at the time.

Results

Men

Ladies

Pairs

Ice dancing

External links
 2003 Trophée Lalique

Trophée Lalique, 2003
Internationaux de France
Trophée Lalique
Trophée Lalique
Trophée Lalique
Figure skating in Paris
International figure skating competitions hosted by France